Edward Meyerstein may refer to:

 E. H. W. Meyerstein (1889–1952), English writer and scholar
 Edward William Meyerstein (1863–1942), British merchant, stockbroker and philanthropist